Amphinema may refer to:
 Amphinema (jellyfish), a genus of jellyfishes in the family Pandeidae
 Amphinema (fungus), a genus of fungi in the family Atheliaceae